Cowan Mountain is a mountain located in the Catskill Mountains of New York southeast of Hobart. Lyon Mountain is located west of Cowan Mountain and Mount Warren is located southwest.

References

Mountains of Delaware County, New York
Mountains of New York (state)